Tung Burapha Stadium is a football stadium in Ubon Ratchathani, Thailand. The stadium is used for football matches. The stadium holds 10,000 people.

References

Football venues in Thailand
Buildings and structures in Ubon Ratchathani province